WBXB (100.1 FM The-B 100.1) is a radio station broadcasting an Urban AC format. Licensed to Edenton, North Carolina, United States, it serves the Elizabeth City, Ahoskie, Windsor, Murfreesboro area. The station is currently owned by Friendship Cathederal Family Worship Center, Inc.

References

External links

BXB
Urban adult contemporary radio stations in the United States